"Black Coffee" is a song written by Hillary Kanter and Even Stevens, and recorded by American country music artist Lacy J. Dalton. It was released in March 1990 as the first single from her album Lacy J. The song reached number 15 on the Billboard Hot Country Singles & Tracks chart in June 1990.

This was the last of Dalton's singles to chart; as was the case with many other country artists in Dalton's age group, she fell out of favor in the early 1990s as a new generation of performers rose to mainstream prominence.

Chart performance

References

1990 singles
Lacy J. Dalton songs
Songs written by Even Stevens (songwriter)
Song recordings produced by Jimmy Bowen
Capitol Records Nashville singles
1990 songs